Earlston High School is a secondary school in Earlston, Scottish Borders. It serves Earlston, as well as the surrounding area. Since 2009, the school has been located on the east edge of Earlston, south of the A6105 road.

Catchment area
Earlston High School accepts all pupils within a certain geographical area. Pupils from the schools below are offered free bus travel to and from the school (provided by Scottish Borders Council):
Channelkirk Primary School
Gordon Primary School
Earlston Primary School
Lauder Primary School
Melrose Primary School
Newtown Primary School
St Boswells Primary School
Westruther Primary School

Pupils from these areas, where there are other high schools, can be accepted but must pay for transport to the school:
Galashiels
Tweedbank
Kelso
Jedburgh
Stow

New school
A new Earlston High School was built along with two other schools in the region, moving the school from the village's High Street to the outskirts. This was to cope with the rising pupil body and the limited space available in the old building. The new location also allowed space for a range of new sports facilities, including dedicated a dedicated rugby field and multi-use games area. A dedicated hockey field was also built in the floodplain just to the north of the school. The new school building was designed by architects 3D Reid and built by Graham Construction, opening its doors to pupils in August 2009.

Primary school
Earlston Primary School has strong links to Earlston High School, and adjoined the old main high school building.

Notable alumni

References

External links
Earlston High School website
Earlston High School statistics
Earlston High's page on Scottish Schools Online

Secondary schools in the Scottish Borders
1877 establishments in Scotland
Educational institutions established in 1877
Earlston